Hermann Wilhelm Prell (1875–1925) was a skillful German Bogenmacher  / Bowmaker.  He was born on July 29, 1875 in Bad Brambach, Germany.  

Hermann Wilhelm spent his formative years as a pupil of Heinrich Hoyer. 

In the early years afterwards he worked for Albert Nurnberger (1893–1895) and August Rau (1896).

The following year (1897) he went to Paris to learn from Eugène Sartory. He established himself independently in Markneukirchen upon his return in 1898 where he lived and worked until his death on 4 April 1925.

Prell went on to become an internationally renowned bow maker.

Quotes

Sartory left an indelible mark on the young Hermann Wilhelm, as can be seen in the bows of his manufacture (the heads as well as the frog design etc.) - Gennady Filimonov

"Prell's bows  were highly regarded by many of the top players of his time (circa 1920's), as was advertised in "The Music Trade Review. (NYC-September 23, 1922) 

"Beauty of design and perfect balance gives to these  bows a super eminent value." - W. Henley

References

 Die Geigen und Lautenmacher -  by Lutgendorff, Frankfurt 1922
Encyclopedia of the Violin - Alberto  Bachmann
 
 
 
Deutsche Bogenmacher-German Bow Makers  Klaus Grunke, Hans Karl Schmidt, Wolfgang Zunterer 2000

1875 births
1925 deaths
Bow makers
German luthiers
People from Markneukirchen